People's republic is an official title, commonly used by some current and former communist states as well as other left-wing governments. It is mainly associated with soviet republics, socialist states following people's democracy, sovereign states with a democratic-republican constitution usually mentioning socialism, as well as some countries that do not fit into any of these categories.

A number of the short-lived socialist states that formed during World War I and its aftermath called themselves people's republics. Many of these sprang up in the territory of the former Russian Empire which collapsed following the Russian Revolution of 1917. Decades later, following the Allied victory in World War II, the name "people's republic" was adopted by some of the newly established Marxist–Leninist states, mainly within the Soviet Union's Eastern Bloc.

As a term, "people's republic" is associated with socialist states as well as communist countries adhering to Marxism–Leninism, although its use is not unique to such states. A number of republics with liberal democratic political systems such as Algeria and Bangladesh adopted the title, given its rather generic nature, after popular wars of independence. Nonetheless, such countries still usually mention socialism in their constitutions.

Marxist–Leninist people's republics 

The first people's republics that came into existence were those formed following the Russian Revolution. Ukraine was briefly declared a people's republic in 1917. The Khanate of Khiva and the Emirate of Bukhara, both territories of the former Russian Empire, were declared people's republics in 1920. In 1921, the Russian protectorate of Tuva became a people's republic, followed in 1924 by neighbouring Mongolia. Following World War II, developments in Marxist–Leninist theory led to the appearance of people's democracy, a concept which potentially allowed for a route to socialism via multi-class, multi-party democracy. Countries which had reached this intermediate stage were called people's republics. The European states that became people's republics at this time were Albania, Bulgaria, Czechoslovakia, Hungary, Poland, Romania and Yugoslavia. In Asia, China became a people's republic following the Chinese Communist Revolution and North Korea also became a people's republic.

Many of these countries also called themselves socialist states in their constitutions. During the 1960s, Romania and Yugoslavia ceased to use the term people's in their official name, replacing it with the term socialist as a mark of their ongoing political development. Czechoslovakia also added the term socialist into its name during this period. It had become a people's republic in 1948, but the country had not used that term in its official name. Albania used both terms in its official name from 1976 to 1991. In the West, these countries are often referred to as communist states. However, none of them described themselves in that way as they regarded communism as a level of political development that they had not yet reached. Terms used by communist states include national-democratic, people's democratic, socialist-oriented and workers and peasants states. The communist parties in these countries often governed in coalitions with other progressive parties.

During the postcolonial period, a number of former European colonies that had achieved independence and adopted Marxist–Leninist governments took the name people's republic. Angola, Benin, Congo-Brazzaville, Ethiopia, Cambodia, Laos, Mozambique and South Yemen followed this route. Following the Revolutions of 1989, the people's republics of Central and Eastern Europe (Albania, Bulgaria, Hungary and Poland) and Mongolia dropped the term people's from their names as it was associated with their former communist governments and became known simply as republics, adopting liberal democracy as their system of government. At around the same time, most of the former European colonies that had taken the people's republic name began to replace it as part of their move away from Marxism–Leninism and towards democratic socialism or social democracy.

List of Marxist–Leninist people's republics 
The current officially Marxist-Leninist states that use the term people's republic in their full names include:
  People's Republic of China (since 1949)
  Lao People's Democratic Republic (since 1975)

Historical examples include:
  People's Republic of Albania (1946–1976) and Socialist People's Republic of Albania (1976–1992)
  People's Republic of Angola (1975–1992)
  People's Republic of Benin (1975–1990)
  Bukharan People's Soviet Republic (1920–1925)
  People's Republic of Bulgaria (1946–1990)
  People's Republic of the Congo (1969–1992)
  People's Democratic Republic of Ethiopia (1987–1991)
  Hungarian People's Republic (1949–1989)
  People's Republic of Kampuchea (1979–1989)
  Khorezm People's Soviet Republic (1920–1925)
  Democratic People's Republic of Korea (1948–1992/2009)
  Mongolian People's Republic (1924–1992)
  People's Republic of Mozambique (1975–1990)
  Polish People's Republic (1944; 1947–1989)
  Romanian People's Republic (1947–1965)
  (1921–1944)
  Ukrainian People's Republic of Soviets (1917–1918) (united into the Ukrainian Soviet Republic)
  People's Democratic Republic of Yemen (1967–1990)
  Federal People's Republic of Yugoslavia (1945–1963)

Other titles commonly used by Marxist–Leninist and socialist states are democratic republic (e.g. the German Democratic Republic, the Somali Democratic Republic, or the Democratic Federal Yugoslavia between 1943 and 1946) and socialist republic (e.g. the Czechoslovak Socialist Republic and the Socialist Republic of Vietnam).

Non-Marxist–Leninist people's republics 
The collapse of the European empires during and following World War I resulted in the creation of a number of short-lived non-Marxist–Leninist people's republics during the revolutions of 1917–1923. In many cases, these governments were unrecognised and often had Marxist–Leninist rivals.

The Russian Empire produced several non-Marxist–Leninist people's republics after the October Revolution. The Crimean People's Republic was opposed to the Bolsheviks and the latter went on to capture its territory and establish the Taurida Soviet Socialist Republic. The anti-Bolshevik Kuban People's Republic was established in Russia's Kuban region and survived until the Red Army captured the area. The socialist-leaning Ukrainian People's Republic declared its independence from the Russian Republic, but it had a rival in the Ukrainian People's Republic of Soviets (later the Ukrainian Soviet Republic) whom it fought during the Ukrainian War of Independence. The Belarusian People's Republic tried to create an independent Belarusian state in land controlled by the German Imperial Army, but the Socialist Soviet Republic of Byelorussia replaced it once the German army had left. All of these territories finally became constituent parts of the Soviet Union.

In the former Austro-Hungarian Empire, the West Ukrainian People's Republic was formed in eastern Galicia under the political guidance of Greek Catholic, liberal and socialist ideologies. The territory was subsequently absorbed into the Second Polish Republic. Meanwhile, the Hungarian People's Republic was established, briefly replaced by the Hungarian Soviet Republic and eventually succeeded by the Kingdom of Hungary.

In Germany, the People's State of Bavaria was a short-lived socialist state and people's republic formed in Bavaria during the German Revolution of 1918–1919 as a rival to the Bavarian Soviet Republic. It was succeeded by the Free State of Bavaria which existed within the Weimar Republic.

During the 1960s and 1970s, a number of former colonies that had gained independence through revolutionary liberation struggles adopted the name people's republic. Examples include Algeria, Bangladesh and Zanzibar. Libya adopted the term after its Al Fateh Revolution against King Idris.

In the 2010s, Ukraine's pro-Russian separatist movements during the Russo-Ukrainian War declared the oblasts of Donetsk and Luhansk to be people's republics, but they did not receive diplomatic recognition from the international community. In 2022, during the prelude to the 2022 Russian invasion of Ukraine, Russia became the first UN member to formally recognise both the DPR and LPR.

List of non-Marxist–Leninist people's republics 
Current non-Marxist–Leninist people's republics include:
  People's Democratic Republic of Algeria (since 1962)
  People's Republic of Bangladesh (since 1971)
  Democratic People's Republic of Korea (since 1992)

Historical people's republics include:
  (1918–1919; partially recognized)
  Crimean People's Republic (1917–1918; unrecognized)
  (2014–2022; partially recognized)
  (1918–1919; unrecognized)
  People's Republic of Korea (1945–1946)
  Kuban People's Republic (1918–1920; unrecognized)
  Great Socialist People's Libyan Arab Jamahiriya (1977–2011)
  (2014–2022; partially recognized)
  (1917–1921; partially recognized)
  (1918–1919; joined the Ukrainian People's Republic)
  People's Republic of Zanzibar (1963–1964)

Other uses 
As a term, people's republic is sometimes used by critics and satirists to describe areas perceived to be dominated by left-wing politics, such as the People's Republic of South Yorkshire.

See also 

 Bolivarianism
 Decolonization
 Democratic republic
 Islamic republic
 List of republics
 List of socialist states
 Narodniks
 Populism
 Völkisch movement

Notes

References

External links 
 

Country name etymology